Swearengin is an unincorporated community in Marshall County, Alabama, United States. A post office operated under the name Swearengin from 1881 to 1907.

References

Unincorporated communities in Marshall County, Alabama
Unincorporated communities in Alabama